Stanislav Benyov (born 19 April 1991) is a Bulgarian luger. He competed at the 2014 Winter Olympics.

References

External links
 

1991 births
Living people
Bulgarian male lugers
Lugers at the 2014 Winter Olympics
Olympic lugers of Bulgaria